Ignacio María Alcorta Hermoso, nicknamed Cholín, (13 December 1906 – 30 Novembrer 1967) was a Spanish footballer who played as a forward. He competed in the men's tournament at the 1928 Summer Olympics, winning his sole international cap in the competition.

At club level he played for local side Tolosa CF, Real Sociedad – where he scored 53 goals in La Liga and 136 overall, and finished on the losing side in the 1928 Copa del Rey Final – and Granada CF. He later had spells as manager at Deportivo Alavés, Real Jaén and three appointments at Granada, where he settled to live until his death in 1967.

References

External links

Cholín  at SE Fútbol

1906 births
1967 deaths
Spanish footballers
Spanish football managers
Spain international footballers
Olympic footballers of Spain
Footballers at the 1928 Summer Olympics
People from Tolosa, Spain
Real Jaén managers
Granada CF managers
Deportivo Alavés managers
Association football forwards
Footballers from the Basque Country (autonomous community)
Real Sociedad footballers
La Liga players
Segunda División players
Segunda División managers
Tolosa CF footballers